Catherine "Kate" Martin (born Lurgan, Co. Cavan)  was an Irish harper. W. H. Grattan Flood described Catherine Martin as a native of Co. Meath. She especially performed airs by Edward Sterling, the parson of Lurgan. She attended the Harp Festivals at Granard in the 1780s and Belfast in 1792.

References

External links
 Haneman

Irish harpists
18th-century Irish musicians
Musicians from County Cavan
Year of birth missing
Year of death missing